Another Day of Life (Polish: Jeszcze dzień życia) is a 2018 Polish-Spanish-Belgian-German-Hungarian animated feature co-production directed by Raúl de la Fuente and Damian Nenow, based on Ryszard Kapuściński's autobiographical account, Another Day of Life.

Cast
 Miroslaw Haniszewski – Ryszard Kapuściński
 Vergil J. Smith – Queiroz / Luis Alberto / Nelson
 Tomasz Zietek – Farrusco
Celia Manuel - Carlota /Dona Cartagina / Woman on the road 
Olga Boladz – Carlota / Dona Cartagina
 Rafal Fudalej – Friedkin / Student
 Pawel Paczesny – Portuguese soldier / Carlos
 Jakub Kamienski – Luis Alberto / Nelson / Daddy
 Kerry Shale – Ryszard Kapuściński (voice)
 Daniel Flynn – Queiroz (voice)
 Youssef Kerkour – Farrusco (voice)
 Lillie Flynn – Carlota (voice)
 Akie Kotabe – Friedkin / Student (voice)
 Ben Elliot – Portuguese soldier (voice)
 Emma Tate - Dona Cartagina (voice)
 Jude Owusu – Carlos (voice)
 Martin Sherman – Luis Alberto / Nelson (voice)
 William Vanderpuye – Daddy (voice)
 Wilson Benedito – Soldier (voice)

Awards and accolades

References

External links
 Official website
 

2018 animated films
2018 films
Polish animated films
Spanish animated films
Belgian animated films
German animated films
Hungarian animated films
European Film Awards winners (films)
Animated feature films
2010s German films